is a Japanese actor, voice actor and narrator affiliated with Aoni Production. He is married to fellow voice actor Shino Kakinuma.

Career
He became famous for his roles in his career as Kagege (Keroro Gunso), Kai Shiden (Mobile Suit Gundam), Shin (Fist of the North Star), Asuma Shinohara (Mobile Police Patlabor), Piccolo (Dragon Ball), Ataru Moroboshi (Urusei Yatsura), Portgas D. Ace (One Piece), and Jann Lee (Dead or Alive). His debut voice role is a soldier in Brave Raideen. Toshio is a veteran who has played a variety of characters from comedians like Ataru of Urusei Yatsura and Inumaru of Gosenzo-sama Banbanzai!, to calm, serious ones like Shin from Fist of the North Star and Piccolo of the Dragon Ball series. Furthermore, Toshio is capable of performing with a "boy voice" and has played noble hot-blooded heroes such as Prince Mito of Saikyō Robo Daiōja and Kento Tate of Future Robo Daltanius.

He performed in the band  with Toru Furuya, Kazuyuki Sogabe, Yūji Mitsuya and Akio Nojima. In 2007, Slapstick got together to pay tribute to former band members, Hirotaka Suzuoki and Kazuyuki Sogabe (guitar).

Furukawa owns a pet dog named , a Shih Tzu that was named after Asuma Shinohara of Patlabor. His former pet was Ataru (あたる), which was named after Ataru Moroboshi of Urusei Yatsura. Ataru died in 2008 at age fifteen and was also a Shih Tzu. Tribute pages were made for both pets.

Filmography

Television animation
{| class="wikitable"
! Year
! Title
! Role
|-
| 1975 || Brave Raideen || Soldier B
|-
| 1976 || Magne Robo Gakeen || Houjou Takeru
|-
| 1977 || Wakusei Robo Danguard Ace || Hideto Oboshi
|-
| rowspan="4" | 1979 || Future Robo Daltanius || Kento Tate
|-
| King Arthur and the Knights of the Round Table || Pellinore
|-
| Mobile Suit Gundam || Kai Shiden
|-
| Space Carrier Blue Noah || Leader Zytel and Domenico
|-
| 1980 ||Trider G7 || Genichi Ooyama
|-
| rowspan="3" | 1981 || Dr. Slump and Arale-chan || Taro Soramame, The Sun, Narration, etc.
|-
| Urusei Yatsura (1981) || Ataru Moroboshi
|-
| Saikyo Robo Daioja || Prince Mito
|-
| rowspan="2" | 1982 || Armored Fleet Dairugger XV || Aki Manabu
|-
| Combat Mecha Xabungle || Blume
|-
| 1983 || Lightspeed ElectroGod Albegas || Daisaku Enjouji
|-
| rowspan="3" |1984
|Galactic Patrol Lensman|Kimball Kinnison
|-
|Hokuto no Ken|| Shin
|-
| The Kabocha Wine || Shunsuke Aoba
|-
| 1985 || Mobile Suit Zeta Gundam || Kai Shiden
|-
| rowspan="3" | 1986 || Anmitsu Hime || Dracula Jr.
|-
| Dragon Ball || General Blue, Piccolo
|-
| Maison Ikkoku || Sakamoto
|-
| rowspan="2" | 1989 || Dragon Ball Z || Piccolo
|-
| Patlabor || Asuma Shinohara
|-
| 1993 || Aoki Densetsu Shoot || Yoshiharu Kubo
|-
| 1995 || Sailor Moon Super S || Hawk's Eye
|-
| 1996 || Dragon Ball GT || Piccolo, Announcer
|-
| rowspan="2" | 1997 || Cutie Honey Flash || Alphonne
|-
| Kindaichi Case Files || Hiroaki Sakurada
|-
| 1998 || Detective Conan || Misao Yamamura
|-
| rowspan="2" | 1999 || The Big O || Eugene Grant
|-
| One Piece || Portgas D. Ace
|-
| 2000 ||Shinzo || Deathcrow
|-
| 2001 || PaRappa the Rapper || Teacher Bunny
|-
| 2002 || Kinnikuman Nisei Series || Suguru Kinniku
|-
| rowspan="4" | 2004 || Agatha Christie's Great Detectives Poirot and Marple || Charles
|-
| Beet the Vandel Buster || Laio, Frausky
|-
| Keroro Gunso || Kagege
|-
| Samurai Champloo || Kagemaru
|-
| rowspan="3" | 2005 || Eureka Seven || William B. Baxter
|-
| The Law of Ueki || Mūnin
|-
| Tsubasa: Reservoir Chronicle || rowspan="2" | Gitsune
|-
| 2006 || xxxHolic 
|-
| 2007 || Tetsuko no Tabi || Hideki Egami
|-
| rowspan="2" | 2008 || Soul Eater || Asura/Kishin
|-
| Bleach || Kageroza Inaba
|-
| 2009 ||Dragon Ball Kai || Piccolo
|-
| 2011 || Hunter × Hunter || Satotz
|-
| rowspan="3" | 2012 || Saint Seiya Omega || Southern Cross Kazuma
|-
| Shirokuma Cafe || Tree Kangaroo
|-
| Tsuritama || Narrator
|-
| rowspan="2" | 2014 || Mushishi: The Next Chapter || Kaoru
|-
| Space Dandy || Ukuleleman
|-
| rowspan="3" | 2015 || World Trigger || Enedora
|-
| Dragon Ball Super || Piccolo
|-
| Ushio and Tora || Yamanmoto
|-
| 2016 ||Mr. Osomatsu || Play-by-play announcer
|-
| rowspan="4" | 2018 ||GeGeGe no Kitarō || Nezumi-Otoko
|-
| Pop Team Epic || Popuko (Episode 2-B)
|-
| Attack on Titan Season 3 || Uri Reiss
|-
| Karakuri Circus ||Bai Jin, Faceless, Sadayoshi Saiga
|-
| 2020 ||Oda Cinnamon Nobunaga || Date Boo Masamune
|-
| rowspan="2" | 2022 ||Dragon Quest: The Adventure of Dai || Myst
|-
|Urusei Yatsura (2022) || Ataru's dad
|-
| rowspan="2" |2023 || Akuma-kun || Mephisto II
|-
| Demon Slayer: Kimetsu no Yaiba || Hantengu
|-
| TBA || Uzumaki || Kirie's father
|-
|}

Original video animation (OVA)Urusei Yatsura (1985-2008) (Ataru Moroboshi)Lupin III: The Plot of the Fuma Clan (1987) (Arsène Lupin III)Bubblegum Crisis (1987-1991) (Leon McNichol)Appleseed (1988) (Calon)Crying Freeman (1988-1994) (Hinomura Yō a.k.a.Crying Freeman)Legend of the Galactic Heroes (1988-2000) (Olivier Poplin)Gosenzo-sama Banbanzai! (1989) (Inumaru Yomota)Saint Seiya: Elysion Hen (2008) (Thanatos)Mobile Suit Gundam Unicorn (2012–14) (Kai Shiden)Mobile Suit Gundam: The Origin (2016–18) (Kai Shiden)

Original net animation (ONA)Lupin Zero (2022) (Lupin II)

Theatrical animation

Video gamesDragon Ball series (1993–present) (Piccolo, General Blue)Mr. Driller series (1999–present) (Taizo Hori, Ataru Hori)

TokusatsuJumborg Ace (1974) (Worker (Actor), Dump Kong (Suit Actor))X-Bomber (1980) (Shiro Ginga)Tetsuwan Tantei Robotack (1998) (Takkard)Bakuryu Sentai Abaranger DELUXE: Abare Summer is Freezing Cold! Movie (2003) (Dimensional Drifter Galvidi)Tokusou Sentai Dekaranger (2004) (Narrator)Kamen Rider Wizard (2012) (Wiseman (Carbuncle (Ep. 8 - 47 (Ep. 48 Voice by Narushi Ikeda)))Kamen Rider × Kamen Rider Wizard & Fourze: Movie War Ultimatum (2012) (Wiseman)

Live-action filmThe Red Spectacles (1987)

Live-action televisionShin Heike Monogatari (1972)

Dubbing roles

Live-action
Billy CrystalCity Slickers (TV Tokyo edition) (Mitch Robbins)Forget Paris (Mickey Gordon)Analyze This (2001 TV Asahi edition) (Ben Sobel M.D.)Parental Guidance (Artie Decker)Small Apartments (Burt Walnut)Aliens (2003 Ultimate Edition) (Bishop (Lance Henriksen))Alien 3 (2005 Ultimate Edition) (Bishop (Lance Henriksen))Back to the Future (1989 TV Asahi edition) (George McFly (Crispin Glover))CHiPs (Ponch (Erik Estrada))Dave (1997 TV Asahi edition) (Dave Kovic (Kevin Kline))Fargo (2002 TV Tokyo edition) (Jerry Lundegaard (William H. Macy))Ghost World (Seymour (Steve Buscemi))The Ice Storm (Ben Hood (Kevin Kline))Independence Day (1999 TV Asahi edition) (U.S. President Thomas J. Whitmore (Bill Pullman))Killing Eve (Paul (Steve Pemberton))Little House on the Prairie (Almanzo Wilder (Dean Butler))Monty Python (Terry Gilliam)Mr. Vampire (Man-choi (Ricky Hui))Out of Africa (Denys Finch Hatton (Robert Redford))Speed (1998 TV Asahi edition) (Harry Temple (Jeff Daniels))The World Is Not Enough (2003 TV Asahi edition) (Victor "Renard" Zokas (Robert Carlyle))

AnimationAntz (Z)Disney's House of Mouse (Panchito Pistoles)Legend of the Three Caballeros (Panchito Gonzalez)Robots (Herb Copperbottom)The Three Caballeros (1994 dub ver) (Panchito Pistoles)Watership Down'' (Hazel)

Awards

References

External links
  
  
 
 
 

1946 births
Living people
Aoni Production voice actors
Japanese dramatists and playwrights
Japanese guitarists
Japanese male video game actors
Japanese male voice actors
Male voice actors from Tochigi Prefecture
Nihon University alumni
20th-century Japanese male actors
21st-century Japanese male actors
Japanese Christians